Pabón is a Spanish surname. Notable people with the surname include:

Dorlan Pabón (born 1988), Colombian footballer
José Pabón (born 1991), Ecuadorian footballer
Marian Pabón (born c. 1958), Puerto Rican actress
Mildred Pabón (born 1957), Puerto Rican jurist
Miriam Pabón (born 1985), Puerto Rican model and beauty pageant winner
Paola Pabón (born 1978), Ecuadorian politician 
Rosemberg Pabón (born 1947), Colombian political scientist
Tony Pabón (1939–2014), American bandleader

Spanish-language surnames